The TS Royalist is a sail training ship launched in 2014 as a replacement for a previous ship of the same name, TS Royalist (1971). She entered service with The Marine Society and Sea Cadets in 2015.

Construction
The ship's hull is of high tensile steel, with her superstructure of glass reinforced plastic. Royalist has a permanent crew of eight, plus up to 24 Cadets and 2 adult trainees. Twelve passengers can also be carried.

History
Royalist was built by Astilleros Gondán S.A., Spain. She was launched on 19 December 2014. She cost £4,800,000. Replacing the previous , she is designed to be easier to sail than her predecessor, and also faster. Royalist entered service in 2015.

References

External links
Sea Cadets website
Square Rigger Club Charity (support organization for TS "Royalist")

2014 ships
Ships built in Spain
Brigs
Individual sailing vessels
Tall ships of the United Kingdom
Merchant ships of the United Kingdom
Training ships of the United Kingdom
Sail training ships